Tanaoctena dubia, the Karamu shoot borer or Coprosma shoot borer moth, is a moth in the family Galacticidae. It was described by Philpott in 1931. It is found in New Zealand.

The wingspan is about 18 mm. The forewings are dull brownish with an inwardly oblique thick blackish fuscous mark in the disc at about one-fourth. There is also a small round blackish fuscous discal dot at two-thirds. The hindwings are fuscous grey.

The larvae feed on Coprosma species. They mine the leaves of their host plant, but also bore into the growing shoot tips, causing these shoots to wilt.

References

External links

Citizen science observations of T. dubia

Moths described in 1931
Galacticidae
Moths of New Zealand
Endemic fauna of New Zealand
Endemic moths of New Zealand